Zachary William "Bill" Dess, (born June 21, 1993), known by his stage name Two Feet, is an American singer, songwriter, and producer from New York City. He attended Tenafly High School in Tenafly, New Jersey. 

Dess used to play locally in jazz and blues ensembles before forming Two Feet. After his single "Go Fuck Yourself" became a viral hit on SoundCloud, he signed with Republic Records. The single reached number 36 on the US Hot Rock Songs chart. His next single, "I Feel Like I'm Drowning", reached number one on the US Alternative Songs chart in 2018. On October 5, 2018, Two Feet released his debut album A 20 Something Fuck, which featured the singles "I Feel Like I'm Drowning" and "Hurt People". On March 13, 2020, he released his second album Pink, and on April 16, 2021, he released his third album Max Maco Is Dead Right?. On May 13, 2022, he released his fourth album Shape & Form.

Discography

Studio albums
A 20 Something Fuck (2018)
Pink (2020)
Max Maco Is Dead Right? (2021)
Shape & Form (2022)

Extended plays
First Steps (2016)
Momentum (2017)

Singles

As lead artist

As featured artist

References

1993 births
American electronic musicians
Living people
Musicians from New York City
Republic Records artists
21st-century American singers